Nottuln (Low German: Notteln) is a municipality in the district of Coesfeld in the state of North Rhine-Westphalia, Germany.

Geography
Nottuln is situated in the Baumberge, approx. 20 km west of Münster.

Neighbouring municipalities
 Billerbeck
 Havixbeck
 Senden, North Rhine-Westphalia
 Dülmen
 Coesfeld

Division of the municipality
The municipality consists of 4 districts
 Nottuln
 Appelhülsen (including Nottuln-Appelhülsen station)
 Schapdetten
 Darup

History
Original settlement of the Nottuln area dates back to about 4000 BC. The name of Nottuln originates from Nutlon, which is probably early German for "nut wood". A church was founded in 860 by Liudger, as well as the first convent in Westphalia.

After a destructive fire in 1748, the parish church and surrounding convent district were rebuilt in baroque style by Johann Conrad Schlaun.

Transport
Nottuln is on the Bundesautobahn 43 and Nottuln-Appelhülsen station in the nearby town of Appelhülsen is on the Wanne-Eickel–Hamburg railway, connecting to Münster. Nottuln has bus lines that reach out to Coesfeld, Darup, and Roxel with the R62/3; Billerbeck and Appelhuelsen with the T85; and Münster with the S60. There are also many bike paths as Nottuln is on many of the Baumberger bike routes.

Points of interest
 Longinus Tower

Notable people 

 Christian Baumeister (born 1971), wildlife filmmaker
 Clemens Maria Franz von Bönninghausen (1785-1864), jurist, homeopath, landowner of Haus Darup and first district councilor of the Coesfeld district 
 Hermann Busenbaum (1600-1668), Jesuit theologian
 Franz Wilhelm Darup (1756-1836), religious author and captain of honor
 Norbert van Heyst, (born 1944), former commander of the 1. German-Dutch Corps in Münster

References

External links
 

Coesfeld (district)